Scopula rufotinctata is a moth of the  family Geometridae. It is found in Turkmenistan and Kyrgyzstan.

References

Moths described in 1913
rufotinctata
Moths of Asia